Miramichi station is a railway station in Newcastle, New Brunswick which is nowadays part of Miramichi, New Brunswick. It is served by Via Rail's Montreal-Halifax train, the Ocean, and is staffed and wheelchair-accessible. The station building is a single storey white block building in an international style, and is located at 251 Station Street (near the terminus of George Street).

References

External links
 
 Via Rail page for the Ocean

Via Rail stations in New Brunswick
Buildings and structures in Miramichi, New Brunswick
Transport in Miramichi, New Brunswick